Harry Parkes (4 January 1920 – 4 March 2009) was an English footballer of the 1940s and 1950s. Parkes was a one club man having only played for Aston Villa. He is widely regarded as one of Aston Villa's most popular players of all time.

Early life 
Parkes was born in Erdington, Birmingham on 4 January 1920.

Football career 
Parkes played in several positions including centre-forward, right-half, and winger, but he played his best football at full-back. He joined Aston Villa in April 1939 as an amateur from Sutton Coldfield club Boldmere St. Michaels. He turned professional in August 1939. He appeared for the club 345 times scoring 4 goals; plus another 144 wartime games. He missed only 12 League games in seven seasons from 1947 to 1954. He also sat on Aston Villa's board of directors in the 1970s.

He was in line for an England call-up in 1946, but an injury meant he could not play, and he never got another chance to play for his country. His only honour with Villa was winning the League War Cup in 1944.

Post-football career 

He retired from playing football in 1955 to concentrate on his sports shop in Corporation Street, Birmingham. At one time it supplied all the boots to the Villa team. The shop closed when Parkes retired in the mid-1990s.

Harry died surrounded by his family members at his home in Solihull on 4 March 2009. Parkes was survived by his wife Marjorie and daughter Valerie and son Derek

References

External links
 Obituary in The Independent

1920 births
2009 deaths
English footballers
Boldmere St. Michaels F.C. players
Aston Villa F.C. players
Footballers from Birmingham, West Midlands
Association football defenders